Jiayou or Gayau is a ubiquitous Chinese expression of encouragement and support. The phrase is commonly used at sporting events and competitions by groups as a rallying cheer and can also be used at a personal level as a motivating phrase to the partner in the conversation.

The phrase is often described as "the hardest to translate well" to English, but has the literal meaning of to "add oil" in Hong Kong English. It is commonly believed that the term originated from first being used at the Macau Grand Prix during the 1960s, where it was a euphemistic cheer by supporters urging the driver to "put more oil into it/step on the gas" during the racing competition to encourage them to speed/accelerate faster.

Analysis 
The term is popularly used for colloquial conversations in Chinese due to its linguistic flexibility in being utilizable in various situations and has been described as an "all purpose cheer." In circumstances of encouragement, it is able to mean "Good Luck!", "Go for it!", "You can do it!", "Don't give up!". As a rallying cry during public events such as a sports competition, it can mean "Go team go!" or "Let's go!" While the term can  be used as an admonishment, where in an example of "Look at those grades, you should jiāyóu!" would mean to "Put more effort into it!", it can also be used as an expression of solidarity with friends, in those situations to mean “I’m behind you” and “I’m rooting for you!"

Usage 
The phrase "Wenchuan jiayou!" was widely used online and in Chinese media as an expression of sympathy and solidarity during the 2008 Sichuan Earthquake particularly for the county of Wenchuan, the epicentre of the earthquake and the most severely impacted area.

At the 2008 Beijing Olympic Games, the Chinese Olympics Team adopted the phrase as its official cheer, which went along with its own corresponding routine of claps.

The term was used as a "rallying cry" and phrase for support during the 2014 Umbrella Movement and the 2019–20 Hong Kong protests. It also became a popular tattoo for protesters; with a certain design the Cantonese text for the phrase, when read sideways, appears to be the Chinese text saying 'Hong Kong'.

During the COVID-19 pandemic that broke out first in the city of Wuhan in Hubei province, the phrase "Wuhan jiayou!" was a common expression of solidarity throughout social and news media but also in public with the city which went under lockdown. Videos soon surfaced online on January 23 of Wuhan residents chanting the phrase, roughly translatable to "Stay strong, Wuhan!" or "Keep on going, Wuhan!", through of their windows to neighbours with many joining in to the chorus to echo across the high-rise buildings of the city.

The phrase was also used to express international solidarity with Wuhan. Relief boxes of face masks sent to Wuhan because of a shortage by its sister-city of Oita in Japan were labelled with "Wuhan jiayou!" On February 2, the UAE declared "We support Wuhan, and the Chinese communities around the world" and projected the phrase "Wuhan jiayou!" onto the Burj Khalifa in Dubai as a message of solidarity.

The phrase gained attention in 2021 when Saturday Night Live alumni Bowen Yang used it in his Weekend Update segment to react to the recent surge in anti-Asian hate crimes in America. The comedian told audiences to "fuel up" (his translation of the cheer) and do more for Asian Americans.

Related terms 
The phrase is comparable to that of Ganbatte! (Japanese: 頑張って) in Japanese and Paiting! (Korean: 파이팅) in Korean.

The literal English translation of Jiayou!, which is "Add oil!", has been adopted by the Oxford Dictionary, and the English translation has become a common phrase in Hong Kong English.

References 

Chinese words and phrases
Cantonese words and phrases
Chinese culture
Culture of Hong Kong
Chants
Positive psychology